Filip Dylewicz (born 25 January 1980) is a Polish former professional basketball player. He also represented the Polish national basketball team in the international competitions.

Professional career
Started playing in basketball in Astoria Bydgoszcz. In August 2013 he signed a contract with Turów Zgorzelec. He won the Polish championship with Turów, after they beat Stelmet Zielona Góra 4–2 in the Finals. Dylewicz was named PLK Finals MVP for the second time in his career, with averages of 16.6 points and 8.3 rebounds per game in the series.

On 15 July 2014 he signed a new two-year deal with Turów.

On 8 August 2016, Dylewicz returned to Trefl Sopot.

On November 17, 2019, he has signed with Stal Ostrów Wielkopolski of the Polish League (PLK).

On July 6, 2020, he has signed with Arka Gdynia of the Polish Basketball League.

On July 4, 2022, he announced his retirement from professional basketball.

Honours
Polish League Champion: (7)
2004, 2005, 2006, 2007, 2008, 2009, 2014
Polish Cup Winner: (2)
2006, 2008
Polish League Finals MVP: 2
2008, 2014

References

External links
 Filip Dylewicz at euroleague.net

1980 births
Living people
Asseco Gdynia players
Astoria Bydgoszcz members
Polish men's basketball players
Power forwards (basketball)
S.S. Felice Scandone players
Sportspeople from Bydgoszcz
Stal Ostrów Wielkopolski players
Trefl Sopot players
Turów Zgorzelec players